Neuendettelsau station is a railway station in the municipality of Neuendettelsau, located in the Ansbach district in Middle Franconia, Germany.

References

Railway stations in Bavaria
Railway stations in Germany opened in 1894
1894 establishments in Bavaria
Buildings and structures in Ansbach (district)